Behar is a surname of Sephardic Jewish origin. Notable people with the surname include:

 Abdellah Béhar (born 1963), Moroccan-born French runner
 Adriana Behar (born 1969), Brazilian volleyball athlete
 Ariel Behar (born 1989), Uruguayan tennis player
 Howard Behar, Former President of Starbucks
 Joy Behar (born 1942), American comedian
 Maksim Behar (born 1955), Bulgarian-Israeli businessman
 Richard Behar, American investigative journalist
 Ruth Behar (born 1956), Cuban-American writer and anthropologist
 Sasha Behar (born 1971), British actress
 Yves Béhar (born 1967), Swiss-born industrial designer

See also
Behar

Hebrew-language surnames